The RAF Staff College may refer to:

RAF Staff College, Andover (active: 1922 to 1940 and 1948 to 1970)
RAF Staff College, Bulstrode Park (active: 1941 to 1948)
RAF Staff College, Bracknell (active: 1945 to 1997)
RAF Staff College (Overseas) in Haifa (active: 1944 to 1946)